Greatest Hits is the first greatest hits album by American singer-songwriter James Taylor, released in November 1976 by Warner Bros. records. As of March 2023, it remains Taylor's best selling album, with over 12 million units being sold in the United States. Greatest Hits is also the 31st best-selling album of fhe 1970's.

The album took place in the context of Taylor's end of his recording contract with Warner Records. It features redone versions of "Carolina in My Mind" and "Something in the Way She Moves", both of which had been previously included on Taylor's self-titled debut album in 1968. It also includes a previously unavailable live version of "Steamroller".

The album did not rise higher than number 23 on the Billboard albums chart on its original release. However it became a steady seller for many years, and Greatest Hits has sold over 12,000,000 copies certifying it as a Platinum album twelve times over, and a Diamond album once (for 10 million copies).

In August 2012, the album re-entered the Billboard 200 albums chart, at number 15, which gave the album a new peak.

Reception

Music critic William Ruhlmann gave the album a positive review, writing for AllMusic that it constitutes a "reasonable collection for an artist who wasn't particularly well-defined by his singles". While cautioning that the release did not quite show the "evolution" of Taylor's songwriting, he stated that it remains "a good sampler" of the artist's early work.

Track listing
All songs were written by James Taylor except where noted.

Side 1
"Something in the Way She Moves" (1976 version) – 3:14
"Carolina in My Mind" (1976 version) – 4:00
"Fire and Rain" – 3:26
"Sweet Baby James" – 2:55
"Country Road" – 3:26
"You've Got a Friend" (Carole King) – 4:33

Side 2
"Don't Let Me Be Lonely Tonight" – 2:39
"Walking Man" – 3:36
"How Sweet It Is (To Be Loved by You)" (Holland-Dozier-Holland) – 3:39
"Mexico" – 3:01
"Shower the People" – 4:01
"Steamroller" (Live) – 5:19

Personnel
James Taylor – acoustic guitar, vocals
Kenny Ascher – electric piano (track 8)
Byron Berline – fiddle (track 2)
Michael Brecker – tenor saxophone (track 7)
David Crosby – harmony vocals (track 10)
Nick DeCaro – hornorgan, voiceorgan (track 11)
Craig Doerge – piano (track 7)
Dan Dugmore – pedal steel guitar (tracks 1, 2)
Victor Feldman – orchestra bells, vibes (track 11)
Andrew Gold – harmonium, backing vocals (track 2)
Milt Holland – percussion (track 10)
Jim Keltner – drums (track 9)
Carole King – piano, backing vocals (tracks 3–5)
Danny Kortchmar – electric guitar (tracks 7, 9–10, 12); credited as Danny Kootch – acoustic guitar, congas (track 6)
Russ Kunkel – drums (tracks 2–7, 10–12); congas (tracks 6–7); cabasa (track 6); tambourine (track 9); shaker (track 10)
Gayle Levant – harp (track 10)
John London – bass guitar (track 4)
Rick Marotta – drums (track 8)
Ralph MacDonald – percussion (track 8)
Clarence McDonald – piano (tracks 2, 9, 12); Fender Rhodes piano (tracks 9, 11); voiceorgan (track 11)
Randy Meisner – bass guitar (track 5)
Joni Mitchell – backing vocals (track 6)
Andy Muson – bass guitar (track 8)
Graham Nash – harmony vocals (track 10)
Gene Orloff – strings (concertmaster) (track 8)
Herb Pedersen – backing vocals (track 1)
Red Rhodes – pedal steel guitar (track 4)
David Sanborn – saxophone (track 9)
Carly Simon – harmony vocals (tracks 9, 11)
Leland Sklar (credited as "Lee" Sklar) – bass guitar (tracks 1–2, 6–7, 9–12)
David Spinozza – electric guitar; acoustic guitar (track 8)
Bobby West (credited as Bobby "Wild Wild" West) – double bass (track 3)

Charts

Weekly charts

Year-end charts

Certifications

See also
List of best-selling albums in the United States

References

1976 greatest hits albums
James Taylor compilation albums
Albums produced by Peter Asher
Albums produced by Lenny Waronker
Albums produced by Russ Titelman
Albums produced by David Spinozza
Warner Records compilation albums
Albums recorded at Sunset Sound Recorders